The 2004 Open 13 was a men's tennis tournament played on indoor hard courts at the Palais des Sports de Marseille in Marseille in France and was part of the International Series of the 2004 ATP Tour. It was the 12th of the tournament and was held from 23 February until 29 February 2004. Unseeded Dominik Hrbatý won the singles title.

Finals

Singles

 Dominik Hrbatý defeated  Robin Söderling 4–6, 6–4, 6–4
 It was Hrbatý's 3rd title of the year and the 8th of his career.

Doubles

 Mark Knowles /  Daniel Nestor defeated  Martin Damm /  Cyril Suk 7–5, 6–3
 It was Knowles's 1st title of the year and the 31st of his career. It was Nestor's 1st title of the year and the 33rd of his career.

References

External links
 Official website 
 ATP tournament profile
 ITF tournament edition details

Open 13
Open 13